Lake Keret is a large freshwater lake in the Republic of Karelia, northwestern part of Russia. It has an area of 223 km². There are about 130 islands on the lake. Keret is used for fishery. Lake Keret freezes up in early November and stays icebound until late May.

Keret